Dorian Bertrand (born 21 May 1993) is a professional footballer who plays as an attacking midfielder or winger for Liga I club FC Argeș Pitești. Born in Réunion, France, he plays for the Madagascar national team.

Club career
A youth product of Saint-Denis FC in his native Réunion, Bertrand moved to mainland France in 2011 and spent most of his early career with Cholet. After being named the player of the season for the Championnat National in 2018, Bertrand transferred to Angers.

Bertrand made his debut for Angers in a 0–0 (3–2) penalty shoot-out loss in the Coupe de la Ligue to Guingamp on 31 October 2018. In January 2019, Bertrand was loaned to Béziers for the rest of the season.

International career
Born in Réunion, France, Bertrand is of Malagasy descent. He debuted for the Madagascar national team in a 2–0 2022 FIFA World Cup qualification loss to Benin on 11 November 2021.

International

Honours
Cholet
 CFA 2 — Group B: 2014–15

Individual
Championnat National Best Player: 2017–18

References

External links
 
 

1993 births
Living people
Sportspeople from Saint-Denis, Réunion
Footballers from Réunion
Association football forwards
People with acquired Malagasy citizenship
Malagasy footballers
Madagascar international footballers
French sportspeople of Malagasy descent
SO Cholet players
AS Béziers (2007) players
Angers SCO players
AS Nancy Lorraine players
Ligue 2 players
FC Argeș Pitești players
Liga I players
Championnat National players
Championnat National 2 players
Championnat National 3 players
Black French sportspeople
Malagasy expatriate footballers
French expatriate sportspeople in Romania
Malagasy expatriate sportspeople in Romania
Expatriate footballers in Romania
French expatriate footballers